Linus Niklas Martin Meyer (born 7 January 1992) is a German footballer who plays as an attacking midfielder for FC Teutonia Ottensen.

Career
Meyer made his professional debut for TSV Havelse in the 3. Liga on 24 July 2021 against 1. FC Saarbrücken.

References

External links
 
 
 
 

1992 births
Living people
Footballers from Hamburg
German footballers
Association football midfielders
FC Eintracht Norderstedt 03 players
SV Rödinghausen players
VSG Altglienicke players
TSV Havelse players
FC Teutonia Ottensen players
3. Liga players
Regionalliga players